Ophyx is a genus of moths of the family Erebidae.

Species
Ophyx bethunei Holloway, 1984
Ophyx bilinea Holloway, 1984
Ophyx chionopasta (Hampson, 1926)
Ophyx crinipes (Felder & Rogenhofer 1874) (Indonesia, Papua New Guinea)
Ophyx deformata Holloway, 1984
Ophyx elliptica Holloway, 1984
Ophyx eurrhoa Lower, 1903 (Australia)
Ophyx excisa (Hulstaert, 1924)
Ophyx inextrema (Prout, 1926)
Ophyx loxographa (Bethune-Baker, 1908)
Ophyx maculosus Holloway, 1979
Ophyx meeki (Bethune-Baker, 1908)
Ophyx ochroptera Guenée, 1852 (Australia)
Ophyx owgarra (Bethune-Baker, 1906)
Ophyx prereducta Holloway, 1984
Ophyx pseudoptera (Lower, 1903) (Australia)
Ophyx reflexa Holloway, 1984
Ophyx striata (Hampson, 1926)
Ophyx talesea Holloway, 1984
Ophyx triangulata Holloway, 1984

Former species
Ophyx pratti (Bethune-Baker, 1906)
Ophyx trifasciata (Swinhoe, 1905)

References

External links
 
 

Ophyx
Glossata genera